I Love That for You is an American comedy television show created and executive produced by Vanessa Bayer and Jeremy Beiler for Showtime. The show stars Bayer as Joanna Gold, an aspiring host for shopping channel SVN, who lies that her childhood cancer has returned in order to keep her job. The story is inspired by Bayer's personal experience with childhood leukemia. I Love That for You premiered on May 1, 2022.

Cast

Main
 Vanessa Bayer as Joanna Gold
 Molly Shannon as Jackie Stilton
 Paul James as Jordan Wahl
 Ayden Mayeri as Beth Ann McGann
 Matt Rogers as Darcy Leeds
 Punam Patel as Beena Patel
 Jenifer Lewis as Patricia Cochran, CEO of SVN

Recurring
 Matt Malloy as Chip Gold
 Michelle Noh as Suzanne Dunaysh
 Bess Armstrong as Marcy Gold
 Jason Schwartzman as Ethan
 Johnno Wilson as Perry

Episodes

Production
I Love That for You was filmed in Los Angeles. The series consists of eight episodes. The show was originally titled I Love This for You.

Reception

Critical response
 Metacritic, which uses a weighted average, assigned a score of 62 out of 100 based on 12 critics, indicating "generally favorable reviews".

Ratings

Notes

References

External links
 

2022 American television series debuts
English-language television shows
Showtime (TV network) original programming
2020s American black comedy television series
Television series by CBS Studios